Route 376 is a short highway in Branson, Missouri. Its southern terminus is at Route 265, and its northern terminus is at Route 76.

Route description
In the south, Route 376 begins at Route 265 and heads northeast as a four-lane highway. It proceeds uneventfully through generally rural land until curving towards the northwest. Entering a more developed area of Branson, the highway turns east and passes the Celebration City theme park. After a series of slight north–south curves, it turns left on to 76 Country Blvd. The Route then curves Northwest-Southeast past the Ruth & Paul Henning Conservation Area and the Shepherd of the Hills properties as a two-lane highway. The route ends at a junction with Route 76, at the south end of the Ozark Mountain Highroad. Past the junction at the Highroad, the road continues west as Route 76.

History
Route 376 was designated by 1996. Prior to January of 2020, the highway ended at 76 Country Boulevard, when the road was designated as Route 76. When 76 Country Boulevard east of current Route 376 was turned over to the City of Branson, Route 76 through Branson was rerouted on to the Ozark Mountain Highroad, bypassing the city.

Junction list

References

External links

376
Transportation in Taney County, Missouri
Transportation in Stone County, Missouri